Sihwan Kim (born December 4, 1988) is an American professional golfer. He plays on the European Tour and the Asian Tour, where he has won two titles. He also plays on the LIV Golf Invitational Series.

Amateur career
Kim was born in Seoul, Korea, and moved with his parents to California at a young age. He graduated from Sunny Hills High School in Fullerton, California where he was captain of the golf team. In 2004, he won the U.S. Junior Amateur at The Olympic Club, 1 up, over David Chung. He won the Mission Hills Desert Junior and the Rolex Tournament of Champions in 2007. He advanced to the round of 16 in the 2008 U.S. Amateur at Pinehurst and tied for sixth with a 11-under-par 269 at the Players Amateur.

Kim attended Stanford University and played college golf with the Stanford Cardinal men's golf team between 2007 and 2011, where he was named Pac-10 Freshman of the Year. He played in the Nationwide Children's Hospital Invitational on the 2008 Nationwide Tour and recorded the lowest finish out of all the amateurs, finishing in a tie for sixth place.

Professional career
Kim turned professional in 2011 and joined the European Challenge Tour in 2012, where he was runner-up at the Rolex Trophy in Switzerland behind Kristoffer Broberg in his rookie season. In 2013, he was runner-up at the Le Vaudreuil Golf Challenge in France and the Kharkov Superior Cup in the Ukraine. He finished 9th on the Order of Merit to graduate to the 2014 European Tour, where he recorded two top-10 finishes. Playing mainly on the Challenge Tour 2015–2017 his best finish was a tied second place at the 2017 Swedish Challenge behind Estanislao Goya of Argentina.

Kim started playing on the Asian Tour in late 2017 after finishing tied 8th at Q-School. In 2018, he finished 8th on the Order of Merit after recording a solo-second at the Yeangder Tournament Players Championship. In 2022, after several close calls, he won his first Asian Tour title at the International Series Thailand, a week after finishing tied-second at the Royal's Cup behind Chan Shih-chang. The next month, he won the Trust Golf Asian Mixed Stableford Challenge in Thailand, two points ahead of Maja Stark in second, after holing a 40-foot putt for eagle on the final hole.

Amateur wins
2004 U.S. Junior Amateur 
2007 Mission Hills Desert Junior, Rolex Tournament of Champions, CordeValle Collegiate Classic

Professional wins (2)

Asian Tour wins (2)

1Mixed event with the Ladies European Tour

Results in major championships

CUT = missed the half-way cut

See also
2013 Challenge Tour graduates
2019 European Tour Qualifying School graduates

References

External links

American male golfers
European Tour golfers
Asian Tour golfers
LIV Golf players
Stanford Cardinal men's golfers
Golfers from Seoul
People from Fullerton, California
1988 births
Living people